Battleground 3: Waterloo is a 1996 computer wargame developed and published by TalonSoft. It is the third entry in the Battleground series.

Gameplay
The game features the Battle of Waterloo which was the final defeat for Napoleon Bonaparte and his French Empire.

Reception

Terry Coleman of Computer Gaming World reported in August 1996 that "BG: Waterloo had, according to Empire (the distributor for Talonsoft in the US), the highest 'buy-in' at retail chains of any historical wargame they've released this year."

A Next Generation critic said Battleground 3: Waterloo "is as good as PC war games get, featuring everything players could want in a turn-based bloodbath: historical accuracy, pleasing graphics, an easy-to-use interface, and strategic subtleties." He remarked that while the game only covers one battle, it has considerable breadth due to its many options, including the ability to play either a historically accurate campaign or a number of "what if" scenarios. He scored it four out of five stars.

The four Battleground games of 1996—Bulge-Ardennes, Shiloh, Antietam and Waterloo—collectively won Computer Games Strategy Pluss wargame of the year award for that year. Waterloo was a finalist for Computer Gaming Worlds 1996 "Wargame of the Year" award, which ultimately went to Battleground 4: Shiloh. Waterloo was a runner-up for Computer Game Entertainments 1996 "Best War Game" prize, which ultimately went to Tigers on the Prowl 2. The magazine's editors called both games "top-notch".

In 1996, Computer Gaming World named Waterloo the 115th best game ever. The editors wrote, "The grand age of warfare comes to life with colorful uniforms, delightful landscapes, and above-average opponent AI in this recent release." The magazine's wargame columnist Terry Coleman named it his pick for the 10th-best computer wargame released by late 1996.

References

External links

GameFAQs

1996 video games
Computer wargames
Multiplayer and single-player video games
TalonSoft games
Turn-based strategy video games
Video games developed in the United States
Windows games